Victivallis vadensis is a Gram-negative, coccus-shaped, bacteria found in the human digestive tract. It measures approximately 0.5-1.3 micrometers in diameter, is non-motile and chemoorganotrophic, and does not form spores. Victivallis vadensis is strictly anaerobic, as are 90 percent of the bacteria in the human gastrointestinal system.

History 

Victivallis vadensis was originally known as strain CelloT, as it is able to use cellobiose as a carbon source. It was later renamed for an area in the Netherlands, known as “Food Valley”, near the scientists at Wageningen University, who first identified the organism. (Victus is Latin for food; vallis is Latin for valley.)

Diversity 

Victavallis vadensis is a facultative anaerobe, like most gut microbes. It has only been sourced from human feces to date and is therefore known only to exist in the human gastrointestinal tract, and is currently the only organism belonging to the order Victivallales and genus Victivallis. Through 16S rRNA sequencing, it has been determined that strain CelloT forms its own cluster in the division Verrumicrobia, and two related but uncultured clones have been found that have a 94% 16S rRNA gene sequence similarity.

The Victavallis vadensis genome contains 4,577,257 bases with 3,541 protein coding sequences, of which 2,031 are functional. G-C bases make up 59.5 percent of the DNA. This bacteria is most closely related to Lentisphaera araneosa with 84.4 percent of the same 16S rRNA. These two organisms are also differentiated based on the environments in which each is found. Lentisphaera spp. are found in sea water, while V. vadensis is found in the human digestive system.

View the latest Victavallis vadensis genetic sequencing data here:
GenBank record ABDE02000001.1
GenBank record ABDE02000027.1

Bacteria -> Lentisphaerota -> which includes Oligosphaera ethanolica, Lentisphaera araneosa, and Victivallis vadensis

Biochemistry 

Because more than half of the human gut microbiome has yet to be cultured, newly discovered species like Victivallis vadensis require extensive culture testing to determine in what situations they best thrive. This microbe, taken from a human fecal sample, was first cultured in the Netherlands at an optimal temperature of 37 degrees Celsius and 6.5 pH. Researchers there discovered that it grows best in liquid or soft agar with one of the following sugars: cellobiose, fructose, galactose, glucose, lactose, lactulose, maltose, maltotriose, mannitol, melibiose, myo-inositol, raftilose, rhamnose, ribose, sucrose and zylose,  which it uses fermentatively. Formation of bacterial colonies under these conditions takes roughly 10 days.

Victivallis vadensis forms a slime layer outside of its cell membrane, which appears halo-like when examined microscopically. Researchers could also see assemblies with dense groups of electrons within the cells, which they believe to be protein precipitates or used for cell storage. Colonies are lens shaped, beige and shiny. It is able to be cultured syntrophically with Methanospirillum hungatei, where it produces methane from glucose in appropriate media. When attempting to isolate in culture, streptomycin and polymyxin B can be added to the media in order to prevent growth of contaminating agents; therefore, Victivallis vadensis is streptomycin and polymyxin B-resistant.

References

External links
Type strain of Victivallis vadensis at BacDive -  the Bacterial Diversity Metadatabase

Gram-negative bacteria
Gut flora bacteria
Lentisphaerota